On June 29, 1972, North Central Airlines Flight 290 collided in mid-air with Air Wisconsin Flight 671 over Lake Winnebago near Appleton, Wisconsin, in the United States. Both aircraft crashed into the lake, killing all 13 people on board.

Flight history

North Central Airlines Flight 290

North Central Airlines Flight 290 was a regularly scheduled flight which usually originated in Houghton, Michigan, and stopped at Ironwood, Michigan, and Green Bay, Oshkosh, and Milwaukee, Wisconsin, before terminating at  Chicago, Illinois. On June 29, 1972, bad weather in northern Michigan necessitated cancellation of the Houghton-Ironwood and Ironwood-Green Bay legs, and the flight originated at Green Bay, using a replacement crew sent from Chicago to Green Bay.

The flight, a Convair CV-580,  departed Green Bay at around 10:30 a.m. CDT, proceeding to Oshkosh under visual flight rules (VFR). At 10:36:11 a.m. CDT, the air traffic controller at Oshkosh cleared Flight 290 to land.  The flight crew's acknowledgment five seconds later was the last communication with North Central Flight 290.

Air Wisconsin Flight 671

Air Wisconsin Flight 671 was a regularly scheduled flight from Chicago, Illinois, to Appleton, Wisconsin, with a stopover at Sheboygan County Memorial Airport west of Sheboygan, Wisconsin. Operating a de Havilland Canada DHC-6 Twin Otter, it departed Chicago at 9:28 a.m. CDT on June 29, 1972, bound for Sheboygan under an instrument flight rules (IFR) plan; en route, the flight crew abandoned its IFR plan and completed the first leg of the flight under VFR.

The flight departed Sheboygan 13 minutes late, at 10:23 a.m. CDT, bound for Appleton, operating under VFR. At about 10:30 a.m. CDT, the flight crew contacted the Air Wisconsin office in Appleton, stating that they anticipated arriving at Appleton at 10:44 a.m. CDT. This was the last communication with Air Wisconsin Flight 671.

Collision

Operating in bright sunshine beneath a scattered cloud layer, Flights 290 and 671 collided at 10:36:47 a.m. The Twin otter crashed into the tail fin of Flight 290, The vertical stabilizer of the Convair sliced through the cabin and wings of the Twin Otter causing Flight 671 to break up in mid-air.

The National Transportation Safety Board noted that the North Central crew would have had to look toward the sun to see the approaching Air Wisconsin plane and concluded that they took no evasive action. Some eyewitnesses believed that the Air Wisconsin Twin Otter began a turn seconds before the collision, but the NTSB did not find sufficient evidence to conclude that the Air Wisconsin crew took evasive action.

Aircraft

The North Central aircraft involved, N50858, had been completed as a Convair CV-340/440 on May 25, 1953; it later was converted to CV-580 standard. The Air Wisconsin Twin Otter had been completed on October 6, 1966. Both aircraft were destroyed by the collision and subsequent water impact. Their wreckage was found on the lake bottom scattered over an area roughly one mile (1.6 km) long by one-half mile (0.8 km) wide.

Casualties

The North Central plane had two passengers and a crew of three (Captain James Cuzzort, First Officer Alton Laabs, and Flight Attendant Frances Rabb) on board, while the Air Wisconsin flight was carrying six passengers and a crew of two (Captain David Jacobs and First Officer Michael Gaffin). All 13 people aboard the two planes died in the collision and subsequent crash, and the NTSB observed that the accident was not survivable.

Investigation

The National Transportation Safety Board released its report on the accident on  April 25, 1973. It was "unable to determine why each crew failed to see and avoid the other aircraft," and concluded that the crash resulted from "the failure of both flight crews to detect visually the other aircraft in sufficient time to initiate evasive action," and stated that it believed "that the ability of both crews to detect the other aircraft in time to avoid a collision was reduced because of the atmospheric conditions and human visual limitations." The NTSB speculated that both flight crews could have been scanning instruments in preparation for descent to their respective destinations at the time of the collision, and this could have reduced their chances of spotting one another. The report also noted that the decision by both flight crews to fly under VFR rather than IFR and the fact that neither captain requested in-flight advisories deprived both aircraft of air traffic control support, and that such support to even one of the aircraft would have ensured sufficient separation to avoid a collision.

The NTSB recommended that the Federal Aviation Administration create a standardized method for training and grading flight crews in visual search techniques and time-sharing between instrument checks and visual searches, and that the FAA expedite the development of anticollision systems.

References

Notes

Bibliography
Aviation Safety Network: ASN Aircraft accident Convair CV-580 N90858 Appleton, WI
National Transportation Safety Board Report Number NTSB-AAR-73-09 “Aircraft Accident Report North Central Airlines, Inc., Allison Convair 340/440 (CV-580), N90858, and Air Wisconsin, Inc., DHC-6, N4043B, Near Appleton, Wisconsin, June 29, 1972,” adopted April 25, 1973

Aviation accidents and incidents in the United States in 1972
Airliner accidents and incidents in Wisconsin
Airliner accidents and incidents caused by pilot error
1972 in Wisconsin
Accidents and incidents involving the Convair CV-240 family
Accidents and incidents involving the de Havilland Canada DHC-6 Twin Otter
North Central Airlines accidents and incidents
Air Wisconsin accidents and incidents
Mid-air collisions
Mid-air collisions involving airliners
Appleton, Wisconsin
June 1972 events in the United States